Ćorić is a Croatian surname. Notable people with the surname include:

Ante Ćorić (born 1997), Croatian footballer
Borna Ćorić (born 1996), Croatian tennis player
Dino Ćorić (born 1990), Bosnian footballer
Josip Ćorić (born 1988), Croatian-born Bosnian-Herzegovinian footballer
Marijan Ćorić (born 1995), Croatian footballer
Tomislav Ćorić (born 1979), Croatian politician
Valentin Ćorić (born 1956), former Bosnian Croat official in the Croatian Republic of Herzeg-Bosnia

Croatian surnames
Patronymic surnames